The Birkhoff polytope Bn (also called the assignment polytope, the polytope of doubly stochastic matrices, or the perfect matching polytope of the complete bipartite graph ) is the convex polytope in RN (where N = n2) whose points are the doubly stochastic matrices, i.e., the  matrices whose entries are non-negative real numbers and whose rows and columns each add up to 1. It is named after Garrett Birkhoff.

Properties

Vertices
The Birkhoff polytope has n! vertices, one for each permutation on n items.  This follows from the Birkhoff–von Neumann theorem, which states that the extreme points of the Birkhoff polytope are the permutation matrices, and therefore that any doubly stochastic matrix may be represented as a convex combination of permutation matrices; this was stated in a 1946 paper by Garrett Birkhoff, but equivalent results in the languages of projective configurations and of regular bipartite graph matchings, respectively, were shown much earlier in 1894 in Ernst Steinitz's thesis and in 1916 by Dénes Kőnig. Because all of the vertex coordinates are zero or one, the Birkhoff polytope is an integral polytope.

Edges
The edges of the Birkhoff polytope correspond to pairs of permutations differing by a cycle:  
  such that  is a cycle.  
This implies that the graph of Bn is a Cayley graph of the symmetric group Sn. This also implies that the graph of B3 is a complete graph K6, and thus B3 is a neighborly polytope.

Facets
The Birkhoff polytope lies within an dimensional affine subspace of the n2-dimensional space of all  matrices: this subspace is determined by the linear equality constraints that the sum of each row and of each column be one. Within this subspace, it is defined by n2 linear inequalities, one for each coordinate of the matrix, specifying that the coordinate be non-negative. For n = 2, there are two facets, given by a11 = a22 = 0, and a12 = a21 = 0.

Symmetries 
The Birkhoff polytope Bn is both vertex-transitive and facet-transitive (i.e. the dual polytope is vertex-transitive).  It is not regular for n>2.

Volume
An outstanding problem is to find the volume of the Birkhoff polytopes.  This has been done for n ≤ 10.  It is known to be equal to the volume of a polytope associated with standard Young tableaux. A combinatorial formula for all n was given in 2007.  The following asymptotic formula was found by Rodney Canfield and Brendan McKay:

For small values  the volume was estimated in 2014 while similar estimations follow.

Ehrhart polynomial

Determining the Ehrhart polynomial of a polytope is harder than determining its volume, since the volume can easily be computed from the leading coefficient of the Ehrhart polynomial. The Ehrhart polynomial associated with the Birkhoff polytope is only known for small values.  It is conjectured that all the coefficients of the Ehrhart polynomials are non-negative.

Generalizations 
The Birkhoff polytope is a special case of the transportation polytope, a polytope of nonnegative rectangular matrices with given row and column sums.  The integer points in these polytopes are called contingency tables; they play an important role in Bayesian statistics.
The Birkhoff polytope is a special case of the matching polytope, defined as a convex hull of the perfect matchings in a finite graph.  The description of facets in this generality was given by Jack Edmonds (1965), and is related to Edmonds's matching algorithm.
 The Birkhoff polytope is a special case of the flow polytope of nonnegative flows through a network. It is related to the Ford–Fulkerson algorithm that computes the maximum flow in a flow network.

See also
 Birkhoff algorithm
 Permutohedron
 Stable matching polytope

References

External links
 Birkhoff polytope Web site by Dennis Pixton and Matthias Beck, with links to articles and volumes.

Polyhedral combinatorics
Matrices